The , colloquially known in English as the bullet train, is a network of high-speed railway lines in Japan. Initially, it was built to connect distant Japanese regions with Tokyo, the capital, to aid economic growth and development. Beyond long-distance travel, some sections around the largest metropolitan areas are used as a commuter rail network. It is owned by the Japan Railway Construction, Transport and Technology Agency and operated by five Japan Railways Group companies.

Over the Shinkansen's 50-plus-year history, carrying over 10 billion passengers, there has not been a single passenger fatality or injury on board due to derailments or collisions.

The network presently links most major cities on the islands of Honshu and Kyushu, and Hakodate on northern island of Hokkaido, with an extension to Sapporo under construction and scheduled to commence in March 2031. Test runs have reached  for conventional rail in 1996, and up to a world record  for SCMaglev trains in April 2015.

The original Tokaido Shinkansen, connecting Tokyo, Nagoya and Osaka, three of Japan's largest cities, is one of the world's busiest high-speed rail lines. In the one-year period preceding March 2017, it carried 159 million passengers, and since its opening more than five decades ago, it has transported more than 6.4 billion total passengers. At peak times, the line carries up to 16 trains per hour in each direction with 16 cars each (1,323-seat capacity and occasionally additional standing passengers) with a minimum headway of three minutes between trains.

The Shinkansen network of Japan had the highest annual passenger ridership (a maximum of 353 million in 2007) of any high-speed rail network until 2011, when the Chinese high-speed railway network surpassed it at 370 million passengers annually, reaching over 2.3 billion annual passengers in 2019.

Etymology 
 in Japanese means 'new trunk line' or 'new main line', but this word is used to describe both the railway lines the trains run on and the trains themselves. In English, the trains are also known as the bullet train. The term  originates from 1939, and was the initial name given to the Shinkansen project in its earliest planning stages. Furthermore, the name , used exclusively until 1972 for  trains on the Tōkaidō Shinkansen, is used today in English-language announcements and signage.

History 

Japan was the first country to build dedicated railway lines for high-speed travel. Because of the mountainous terrain, the existing network consisted of  narrow-gauge lines, which generally took indirect routes and could not be adapted to higher speeds due to technical limitations of narrow-gauge rail. Consequently, Japan had a greater need for new high-speed lines than countries where the existing standard gauge or broad gauge rail system had more upgrade potential.

Among the key people credited with the construction of the first Shinkansen are Hideo Shima, the Chief Engineer, and Shinji Sogō, the first President of Japanese National Railways (JNR) who managed to persuade politicians to back the plan. Other significant people responsible for its technical development were Tadanao Miki, Tadashi Matsudaira, and Hajime Kawanabe based at the Railway Technical Research Institute (RTRI), part of JNR. They were responsible for much of the technical development of the first line, the Tōkaidō Shinkansen. All three had worked on aircraft design during World War II.

Early proposals 

The popular English name bullet train is a literal translation of the Japanese term , a nickname given to the project while it was initially discussed in the 1930s. The name stuck because of the original 0 Series Shinkansen's resemblance to a bullet and its high speed.

Over the next three years, the Ministry of Railways drew up more ambitious plans to extend the line to Beijing (through a tunnel to Korea) and even Singapore, and build connections to the Trans-Siberian Railway and other trunk lines in Asia. These plans were abandoned in 1943 as Japan's position in World War II worsened. However, some construction did commence on the line; several tunnels on the present-day Shinkansen date to the war-era project.

Construction 
Following the end of World War II, high-speed rail was forgotten for several years while traffic of passengers and freight steadily increased on the conventional Tōkaidō Main Line along with the reconstruction of Japanese industry and economy. By the mid-1950s the Tōkaidō Line was operating at full capacity, and the Ministry of Railways decided to revisit the Shinkansen project. This train gave designers the confidence that they could safely build an even faster standard gauge train. Thus the first Shinkansen, the 0 series, was built on the success of the Romancecar.

In the 1950s, the Japanese national attitude was that railways would soon be outdated and replaced by air travel and highways as in the United States and many countries in Europe. However, Shinji Sogō, President of Japanese National Railways, insisted strongly on the possibility of high-speed rail, and the Shinkansen project was implemented.

Government approval came in December 1958, and construction of the first segment of the Tōkaidō Shinkansen between Tokyo and Osaka started in April 1959. The cost of constructing the Shinkansen was at first estimated at nearly 200 billion yen, which was raised in the form of a government loan, railway bonds and a low-interest loan of US$80 million from the World Bank. Initial estimates, however, were deliberately understated and the actual cost was about 400 billion yen. As the budget shortfall became clear in 1963, Sogo resigned to take responsibility.

A test facility for rolling stock, now part of the line, opened in Odawara in 1962.

Initial success 

The Tōkaidō Shinkansen began service on 1 October 1964, in time for the first Tokyo Olympics. The conventional Limited Express service took six hours and 40 minutes from Tokyo to Osaka, but the Shinkansen made the trip in just four hours, shortened to three hours and ten minutes by 1965. It enabled day trips between Tokyo and Osaka, the two largest metropolises in Japan, significantly changed the style of business and life of the Japanese people, and increased new traffic demand. The service was an immediate success, reaching the 100 million passenger mark in less than three years on 13 July 1967, and one billion passengers in 1976. Sixteen-car trains were introduced for Expo '70 in Osaka. With an average of 23,000 passengers per hour in each direction in 1992, the Tōkaidō Shinkansen was the world's busiest high-speed rail line. As of 2014, the train's 50th anniversary, daily passenger traffic rose to 391,000 which, spread over its 18-hour schedule, represented an average of just under 22,000 passengers per hour.

The last of these trains, with their classic bullet-nosed appearance, were retired on 30 November 2008. A driving car from one of the 0 series trains was donated by JR West to the National Railway Museum in York, United Kingdom in 2001.

Network expansion 
The Tōkaidō Shinkansen's rapid success prompted an extension westward to Okayama, Hiroshima and Fukuoka (the San'yō Shinkansen), which was completed in 1975. Prime Minister Kakuei Tanaka was an ardent supporter of the Shinkansen, and his government proposed an extensive network paralleling most existing trunk lines. Two new lines, the Tōhoku Shinkansen and Jōetsu Shinkansen, were built following this plan. Many other planned lines were delayed or scrapped entirely as JNR slid into debt throughout the late 1970s, largely because of the high cost of building the Shinkansen network. By the early 1980s, the company was practically insolvent, leading to its privatization in 1987.

Development of the Shinkansen by the privatised regional JR companies has continued, with new train models developed, each generally with its own distinctive appearance (such as the 500 series introduced by JR West).

Since 1970, development has also been underway for the Chūō Shinkansen, a planned maglev line from Tokyo to Osaka.

Technology 
To enable high-speed operation, Shinkansen uses a range of advanced technology compared with conventional rail, achieving not only high speed but also a high standard of safety and comfort. Its success has influenced other railways in the world, demonstrating the importance and advantages of high-speed rail.

Routing 
Shinkansen routes never intersect with slower, narrow-gauge conventional lines (except mini-shinkansen, which runs along these older lines). Consequently, the shinkansen is not affected by slower local or freight trains (except for Hokkaido Shinkansen while traveling through the Seikan Tunnel), and has the capacity to operate many high-speed trains punctually. In addition, shinkansen routes (excluding mini-shinkansen) are completely grade separated from roads and highways, meaning railway crossings are almost entirely eliminated. Tracks are strictly off-limits with penalties against trespassing strictly regulated by law.

Track 

The Shinkansen uses  standard gauge in contrast to the  narrow gauge of older lines. Continuous welded rail and swingnose crossing points are employed, eliminating gaps at turnouts and crossings. Long rails are used, joined by expansion joints to minimize gauge fluctuation due to thermal elongation and shrinkage.

A combination of ballasted and slab track is used, with slab track exclusively employed on concrete bed sections such as viaducts and tunnels. Slab track is significantly more cost-effective in tunnel sections, since the lower track height reduces the cross-sectional area of the tunnel, reducing construction costs up to 30%.
However, the smaller diameter of Shinkansen tunnels, compared to some other high-speed lines, has resulted in the issue of tunnel boom becoming a concern for residents living close to tunnel portals.

The slab track consists of rails, fasteners and track slabs with a cement asphalt mortar. The prefabricated upstands are made of either reinforced concrete or pre-stressed reinforced concrete; they prevent the track slab from moving latitudinally or longitudinally.

Signal system 

The Shinkansen employs an ATC (Automatic Train Control) system, eliminating the need for trackside signals. It uses a comprehensive system of Automatic Train Protection. Centralized traffic control manages all train operations, and all tasks relating to train movement, track, station and schedule are networked and computerized.

Electrical systems 
Shinkansen uses a 25 kV AC overhead power supply (20 kV AC on Mini-shinkansen lines), to overcome the limitations of the 1,500 V direct current used on the existing electrified narrow-gauge system. Power is distributed along the train's axles to reduce the heavy axle loads under single power cars. The AC frequency of the power supply for the Tokaido Shinkansen is 60 Hz.

Trains 
Shinkansen trains are electric multiple units, offering fast acceleration, deceleration and reduced damage to the track because of the use of lighter vehicles compared to locomotives or power cars. The coaches are air-sealed to ensure stable air pressure when entering tunnels at high speed.

Traction 
The Shinkansen has used the electric multiple unit configuration from the outset, with the 0 Series Shinkansen having all axles powered. Other railway manufacturers were traditionally reluctant or unable to use distributed traction configurations (Talgo, the German ICE 2 and the French (and subsequently South Korean) TGV (and KTX-I and KTX-II) use the locomotive (also known as power car) configuration with the AVE Class 102 and continues with it for the Talgo AVRIL because it is not possible to use powered bogies as part of Talgo's bogie design, which uses a modified Jacobs bogie with a single axle instead of two and allows the wheels to rotate independently of each other, on the ICE 2, TGV and KTX it is because it easily allows for a high ride quality and less electrical equipment.) In Japan, significant engineering desirability exists for the electric multiple unit configuration. A greater proportion of motored axles permits higher acceleration, so the Shinkansen does not lose as much time if stopping frequently. Shinkansen lines have more stops in proportion to their lengths than high-speed lines elsewhere in the world.

Lines 
The main Shinkansen lines are:

In practice, the Tokaido, San'yō, and Kyushu lines form a contiguous west/southbound line from Tokyo, as train services run between the Tokaido and San'yō lines and between the San'yō and Kyushu lines, though the lines are operated by different companies.

The Tokaido Shinkansen tracks are not physically connected to the lines of the Tohoku Shinkansen at Tokyo Station, as they are operated by separate companies and have separate platforms. Therefore, there is no through service between those lines. All northbound services from Tokyo travel along the Tohoku Shinkansen until at least Ōmiya.

Two further lines, known as Mini-shinkansen, have also been constructed by re-gauging and upgrading existing sections of line:
 Yamagata Shinkansen (Fukushima – Shinjō)
 Akita Shinkansen (Morioka – Akita)

There are two standard-gauge lines not technically classified as Shinkansen lines but run Shinkansen trains as they use tracks leading to Shinkansen storage/maintenance yards:
 Hakata Minami Line (Hakata – Hakata-Minami)
 Gala-Yuzawa Line – technically a branch of the Jōetsu Line – (Echigo-Yuzawa – Gala-Yuzawa)

Lines under construction 
The following lines are under construction. These lines except Chuo Shinkansen, called  or planned Shinkansen, are the Shinkansen projects designated in the Basic Plan decided by the government. 

 Hokuriku Shinkansen extension from Kanazawa to Tsuruga is under construction and is scheduled to open in fiscal 2022. Between Hakusan Depot near Kanazawa and Tsuruga, the  Shinkansen station was constructed in conjunction with the rebuilding of the adjoining conventional (narrow gauge) line station in anticipation of construction of the line to Osaka. 
 Chuo Shinkansen (Tokyo–Nagoya–Osaka) is a planned maglev line. JR Central has announced a 2027 target date for the line from Tokyo to Nagoya. Construction of the project commenced in 2014.

Planned lines 

 The extension of Hokuriku Shinkansen to Osaka is proposed, with the route via Obama and Kyoto selected by the government on 20 December 2016. Construction is proposed to commence in 2030, and take 15 years.
 Nishi Kyushu Shinkansen has been built to full Shinkansen standards between Takeo Onsen and Nagasaki, with the existing narrow-gauge line from Shin-Tosu to Takeo Onsen to remain as narrow-gauge track, although there is a proposal to build the section between Shin-Tosu and Takeo Onsen to full Shinkansen standards. In 2018, the Ministry of Land, Infrastructure, Transport and Tourism released cost-benefit analysis results to compare and contrast full Shinkansen, mini-Shinkansen, and Gauge Change Train for this section.
 The extension of Chuo Shinkansen to Osaka is proposed to open in 2037.

Cancelled line 

The Narita Shinkansen project to connect Tokyo to Narita International Airport, initiated in the 1970s but halted in 1983 after landowner protests, has been officially cancelled and removed from the Basic Plan governing Shinkansen construction. Parts of its planned right-of-way were used by the Narita Sky Access Line which opened in 2010, and the Keiyo Line reused space originally set aside for the Narita Shinkansen terminus at Tokyo Station. Although the Sky Access Line uses standard-gauge track, it was not built to Shinkansen specifications and there are no plans to convert it into a full Shinkansen line.

Proposed lines 

Many Shinkansen lines were proposed during the boom of the early 1970s but have yet to be constructed and have subsequently been shelved indefinitely.
 Hokkaido Shinkansen northward extension: Sapporo–Asahikawa
 : Oshamanbe–Muroran–Sapporo
 : Toyama–Niigata–Aomori
 Toyama–Jōetsu-Myōkō exists as part of the Hokuriku Shinkansen, and Nagaoka–Niigata exists as part of the Jōetsu Shinkansen, with provisions for the Uetsu Shinkansen at Nagaoka.
 : Fukushima–Yamagata–Akita
 Fukushima–Shinjō and Ōmagari–Akita exist as the Yamagata Shinkansen and Akita Shinkansen, respectively, but as "Mini-Shinkansen" upgrades of existing track, they do not meet the requirements of the Basic Plan.
 : Nagoya–Tsuruga
 : Osaka–[Tottori–Matsue–Shimonoseki
 : Okayama–Matsue
 : Osaka–Tokushima–Takamatsu–Matsuyama–Ōita
 : Okayama–Kōchi–Matsuyama
 There have been some activity regarding the Shikoku and Trans-Shikoku Shinkansen in recent years. In 2016, the Shikoku and Trans-Shikoku Shinkansen were identified as potential future projects in a review of long-term plans for the Shikoku area and funds allocated towards the planning of the route. A profitability study has also been commissioned by the city of Oita in 2018 that found the route to be potentially profitable
 : Fukuoka–Ōita–Miyazaki–Kagoshima
 : Ōita–Kumamoto

In addition, the Basic Plan specified that the Jōetsu Shinkansen should start from Shinjuku, not Tokyo Station, which would have required building an additional  of track between Shinjuku and Ōmiya. While no construction work was ever started, land along the proposed track, including an underground section leading to Shinjuku Station, remains reserved. If capacity on the current Tokyo–Ōmiya section proves insufficient, at some point, construction of the Shinjuku–Ōmiya link may be reconsidered.

In December 2009, then transport minister Seiji Maehara proposed a bullet train link to Haneda Airport, using an existing spur that connects the Tōkaidō Shinkansen to a train depot. JR Central called the plan "unrealistic" due to tight train schedules on the existing line, but reports said that Maehara wished to continue discussions on the idea. The current minister has not indicated whether this proposal remains supported. While the plan may become more feasible after the opening the Chuo Shinkansen (sometimes referred to as a bypass to the Tokaido Shinkansen) frees up capacity, construction is already underway for other rail improvements between Haneda and Tokyo station expected to be completed prior to the opening of the 2020 Tokyo Olympics, so any potential Shinkansen service would likely offer only marginal benefit beyond that. Despite these plans ultimately not being realized (owing in part due to the effects of the COVID-19 pandemic), various rail projects in the vicinity of Haneda Airport, including the Haneda Airport Access Line and the Tokyo Rinkai Subway Line, continue to undergo planning.

Service names 

Originally intended to carry passenger and freight trains by day and night, the Shinkansen lines carry only passenger trains. The system shuts down between midnight and 06:00 every day for maintenance. The few overnight passenger trains that still run in Japan run on the older narrow gauge network that the Shinkansen parallels.

Tōkaidō, San'yō and Kyushu Shinkansen 
 Nozomi (express i.e. stops at the least amount of stations, Tokaido and San'yō)
 Hikari (semi-express i.e. stops at the most important stations, Tokaido and San'yō)
 Hikari Rail Star (semi-express, San'yō)
 Kodama (local i.e. stops at all stations along the way, Tokaido and San'yō)
 Sakura (semi-express, San'yō and Kyushu)
 Mizuho (express, San'yō and Kyushu)
 Tsubame (local, Kyushu)

Tōhoku, Hokkaido, Yamagata and Akita Shinkansen 
 Hayabusa (express, Tohoku & Hokkaido, using E5 series/H5 series trains)
 Hayate (local, Tohoku & Hokkaido. The express service was discontinued in 2019)
 Yamabiko (semi-express, Tohoku)
 Nasuno (local, Tohoku)
 Aoba (discontinued)
 Komachi (Akita)
 Tsubasa (Yamagata)

Jōetsu Shinkansen 
 Toki / Max Toki (semi-express, Jōetsu)
 Tanigawa / Max Tanigawa (local, Jōetsu)
 Asahi / Max Asahi (discontinued)

Hokuriku Shinkansen
 Kagayaki (express, Hokuriku)
 Hakutaka (semi-express, Hokuriku)
 Tsurugi (local, Hokuriku)
 Asama (local, Hokuriku)

Nishi Kyushu Shinkansen 

 Kamome

Train types 
Trains are up to sixteen cars long. Stations are similarly long to accommodate these trains. Some of Japan's high-speed maglev trains are considered Shinkansen, while other slower maglev trains (such as the Linimo maglev train line serving local community near the city of Nagoya in Aichi, Japan) are intended as alternatives to conventional urban rapid transit systems.

Passenger trains

Tokaido and San'yō Shinkansen 
 0 series: The first Shinkansen trains which entered service in 1964. More than 3,200 cars were built. Withdrawn in December 2008.
 100 series: Entered service in 1985, and featured bilevel cars with restaurant car and compartments. Later used only on San'yō Shinkansen Kodama services. Withdrawn in March 2012.
Withdrawn in March 2012.
Since 2008, sets have been shortened from 16 to 8 cars for use on San'yō Shinkansen Kodama services.
The JR Central owned units were withdrawn in March 2020, with the JR West owned units continuing to operate on the San'yō Shinkansen line between Shin-Osaka and Hakata.
 N700A series: An upgraded version of N700 series with improved acceleration & deceleration and quieter traction motors. All N700 series sets are now converted to N700A.
 N700S series: An evolution of the N700 series. First trainset was rolled out in 2019 with passenger services commencing on 1 July 2020.

Kyushu Shinkansen 

Nishi Kyushu Shinkansen 

 N700S-8000 series: 6-car trains introduced in 2022 on the Kamome services with a maximum speed of 260km/h.

Tohoku, Hokkaido, Joetsu, and Hokuriku Shinkansen 
 200 series: The first type introduced on the Tohoku and Joetsu Shinkansen in 1982 and withdrawn in April 2013. The final configuration was as 10-car sets. 12-car and 16-car sets also operated at earlier times. 
 E1 series: Bilevel 12-car trains introduced in 1994 and withdrawn in September 2012.
 E4 series: Bilevel 8-car trains introduced in 1997 and withdrawn in October 2021.
In 2019, the E7 series began operating on the Joetsu Shinkansen.

Yamagata and Akita Shinkansen 
 400 series: The first Mini-shinkansen type, introduced in 1992 on Yamagata Shinkansen Tsubasa services with a maximum speed of 240 km/h. Withdrawn in April 2010.
 E3 series: Introduced in 1997 on Akita Shinkansen Komachi and Yamagata Shinkansen Tsubasa services with a maximum speed of 275 km/h. Now operated solely on the Yamagata Shinkansen.
 E8 series: Future replacement of the E3 series for Tsubasa services to be introduced from 2024

Experimental trains 
 Class 1000 – 1961
 Class 951 – 1969
 Class 961 – 1973
 Class 962 – 1979
 500-900 series "WIN350" – 1992
 Class 952/953 "STAR21" – 1992
 Class 955 "300X" – 1994 
 Gauge Change Train – 1998 to present
 Class E954 "Fastech 360S" – 2004
 Class E955 "Fastech 360Z" – 2005
 Class E956 "ALFA-X" – 2019

Maglev trains 
Note that these trains were and currently are used only for experimental runs, though the L0 series could be a passenger train.
 LSM200 – 1972
 ML100 – 1972
 ML100A – 1975
 ML-500 – 1977
 ML-500R – 1979
 MLU001 – 1981
 MLU002 – 1987 
 MLU002N – 1993
 MLX01 – 1996
 L0 series – 2012

Maintenance vehicles 
 911 Type diesel locomotive
 912 Type diesel locomotive
 DD18 Type diesel locomotive
 DD19 Type diesel locomotive
 941 Type (rescue train)
 921 Type (track inspection car)
 922 Type (Doctor Yellow sets T1, T2, T3)
 923 Type (Doctor Yellow sets T4, T5)
 925 Type (Doctor Yellow sets S1, S2)
 E926 Type (East i)

Speed records

Traditional rail

Maglev

Reliability

Punctuality 
The Shinkansen is very reliable thanks to several factors, including its near-total separation from slower traffic. In 2016, JR Central reported that the Shinkansen's average delay from schedule per train was 24 seconds. This includes delays due to uncontrollable causes, such as natural disasters. The record in 1997 was 18 seconds.

Safety record 
Over the Shinkansen's 50-plus year history, carrying over 10 billion passengers, there have been no passenger fatalities due to train accidents such as derailments or collisions, despite frequent earthquakes and typhoons. Injuries and a single fatality have been caused by doors closing on passengers or their belongings; attendants are employed at platforms to prevent such accidents. There have, however, been suicides by passengers jumping both from and in front of moving trains. On 30 June 2015, a passenger committed suicide on board a Shinkansen train by setting himself on fire, killing another passenger and seriously injuring seven other people.

There have been two derailments of Shinkansen trains in passenger service. The first one occurred during the Chūetsu earthquake on 23 October 2004. Eight of ten cars of the Toki No. 325 train on the Jōetsu Shinkansen derailed near Nagaoka Station in Nagaoka, Niigata. There were no casualties among the 154 passengers.

Another derailment happened on 2 March 2013 on the Akita Shinkansen when the Komachi No. 25 train derailed in blizzard conditions in Daisen, Akita. No passengers were injured.

In the event of an earthquake, an earthquake detection system can bring the train to a stop very quickly; newer trainsets are lighter and have stronger braking systems, allowing for quicker stopping.  A new anti-derailment device was installed after detailed analysis of the Jōetsu derailment.

Several months after the exposure of the Kobe Steel falsification scandal, which is among the suppliers of high-strength steel for Shinkansen trainsets, cracks were found upon inspection of a single bogie, and removed from service on 11 December 2017.

Impacts

Economics 
The Shinkansen has had a significant beneficial effect on Japan's business, economy, society, environment and culture beyond mere construction and operational contributions. That does not include the savings from reduced reliance on imported fuel, which also has national security benefits. Shinkansen lines, particularly in the very crowded coastal Taiheiyō Belt megalopolis, met two primary goals:

 Shinkansen trains reduced the congestion burden on regional transportation by increasing throughput on a minimal land footprint, therefore being economically preferable compared to modes (such as airports or highways) common in less densely populated regions of the world. 
 As rail was already the primary urban mode of passenger travel, from that perspective it was akin to a sunk cost; there was not a significant number of motorists to convince to switch modes. The initial megalopolitan Shinkansen lines were profitable and paid for themselves. Connectivity rejuvenated rural towns such as Kakegawa that would otherwise be too distant from major cities.

However, upon the introduction of the 1973 Basic Plan the initial prudence in developing Shinkansen lines gave way to political considerations to extend the mode to far less populated regions of the country, partly to spread these benefits beyond the key centres of Kanto and Kinki. Although in some cases regional extension was frustrated by protracted land acquisition issues (sometimes influenced by the cancellation of the Narita Shinkansen following fierce protests by locals), over time Shinkansen lines were built to relatively sparsely populated areas with the intent the network would disperse the population away from the capital.

Such expansion had a significant cost. JNR, the national railway company, was already burdened with subsidizing unprofitable rural and regional railways.

Following privatization, the JR group of companies have continued Shinkansen network expansion to less populated areas, but with far more flexibility to spin-off unprofitable railways or cut costs than in JNR days. Currently, an important factor is the post bubble zero interest-rate policy that allows JR to borrow huge sums of capital without significant concern regarding repayment timing.

A UCLA study found that the presence of a Shinkansen line had helped with housing affordability by making it more realistic for lower-income city workers to live in exurban areas much further away from the city, which tends to have cheaper housing options. That in turn helps the city to "decentralise" and thus reduce the city property prices from what they could have otherwise been.

Environment 

Challenges

Noise pollution 
Noise pollution concerns have made increasing speed more difficult. In Japan, population density is high and there have been severe protests against the Shinkansen's noise pollution. Its noise is now limited to less than 70 dB in residential areas.
Improvement and reduction of the pantograph, weight saving of cars, and construction of noise barriers and other measures have been implemented. Current research is primarily aimed at reducing operational noise, particularly the tunnel boom phenomenon caused when trains transit tunnels at high speed.

Earthquake 
Because of the risk of earthquakes in Japan, the Urgent Earthquake Detection and Alarm System (UrEDAS) (an earthquake warning system) was introduced in 1992. It enables automatic braking of Shinkansen trains in the event of large earthquakes.

Heavy snow 
The Tōkaidō Shinkansen often experiences heavy snow in the area around Maibara Station between December and February, requiring trains to reduce speed thus disrupting the timetable. Snow-dispersing sprinkler systems have been installed, but delays of 10–20 minutes still occur during snowy weather. Snow-related treefalls have also caused service interruptions. Along the Jōetsu Shinkansen route, snow can be very heavy, with depths of two to three metres; the line is equipped with stronger sprinklers and slab track to mitigate the snow's effects. Despite having multiple days with delays longer than 30 minutes, the Tōhoku Shinkansen still presents a slight advantage in reliability compared to air travel on days with significant snowfall.

Ridership

Annual

* The sum of the ridership of individual lines does not equal the ridership of the system because a single rider may be counted multiple times when using multiple lines, to get proper ridership figures for a system, in the above case, is only counted once.

** Only refers to 6 days of operation: 26 March 2016 (opening date) to 31 March 2016 (end of FY2015).

Until 2011, Japan's high-speed rail system had the highest annual patronage of any system worldwide, China's HSR network's patronage reached 1.7 billion and is now the world's highest.

Cumulative comparison

Notes:
  Data in italics includes extrapolated estimations where data is missing. Turkey and Russia data here is included in "Europe" column, rather than split between Asia and Europe.  Only systems with 200 km/h or higher regular service speed are considered.
 "Shinkansen share(%)" refers to percent of Shinkansen ridership (including fully assembled exported trainsets) as a percent of "World" total.  Currently this only pertains to Taiwan, but may change if Japan exports Shinkansen to other nations.
 "Shinkansen" column does not include Shinkansen knock down kits made in Japan exported to China for assembly, or any derivative system thereof in China)
 "Asia (other)" column refers to sum of riderships of all HSR systems geographically in Asia that do not use Shinkansen. (this data excludes Russia and Turkey, which geographically have parts in Asia but for sake of convenience included in Europe column)
 For 2013, Japan's Ministry of Transport has not updated data, nor is summed European data available (even 2012 data is very rough), however Taiwan ridership is 47.49 million and Korea with 54.5 million and China with 672 million in 2013.

Cumulative ridership since October 1964 is over 5 billion passengers for the Tokaido Shinkansen Line alone and 10 billion passengers for Japan's entire shinkansen network. Nevertheless, China's share is increasing fast, as close to 9.5 billion passengers in that nation have been served by the end of 2018 and is projected to pass Japan's cumulative numbers by as early as 2020.

Future

Speed increases

Tōhoku Shinkansen

The ALFA-X is currently undergoing testing.

Hokkaido Shinkansen
There are approximately 50 freight trains using the dual gauge section each day, so limiting the travel of such trains to times outside of Shinkansen services is not an option. Because of this and other weather-related factors cited by JR East and JR Hokkaido, the fastest journey time between Tokyo and Shin-Hakodate-Hokuto is currently 3 hours, 57 minutes.

 
This would enable a travel time from Tokyo to Shin-Hakodate-Hokuto of 3 hours and 45 minutes, a saving of 12 minutes on the current timetable.

Hokuriku extension 

The Hokuriku Shinkansen is being extended from Kanazawa to Tsuruga (proposed for completion by fiscal year 2024) at an estimated cost of 3.04 trillion yen (in 2012 currency).

There are further plans to extend the line from Tsuruga to Osaka, with the Obama-Kyoto route chosen by the government on 20 December 2016, after a government committee investigated the five nominated routes.

Construction of the extension beyond Tsuruga is not expected to commence before 2030, with a projected 15-year construction period. On 6 March 2017 the government committee announced the chosen route from Kyoto to Shin-Osaka is to be via Kyotanabe, with a station at Matsuiyamate on the Katamachi Line.

Interim plans
To extend the benefits of the Hokuriku Shinkansen to stations west of Tsuruga before the line to Osaka is completed, JR West was working in partnership with Talgo on the development of a Gauge Change Train (CGT) capable of operating under both the 25 kV AC electrification used on the Shinkansen and the 1.5 kV DC system employed on conventional lines. A trial of the proposed bogie was undertaken on a purpose-built  gauge-changer at Tsuruga, but it was unsuccessful and the plans were abandoned.

Tohoku extension/Hokkaido Shinkansen 

The  extension will be approximately 76% in tunnels, including major tunnels such as Oshima (~), Teine (~) and Shiribeshi (~).

Although an extension from Sapporo to Asahikawa was included in the 1973 list of planned lines, at this time it is unknown whether the Hokkaido Shinkansen will be extended beyond Sapporo.

Nishi Kyushu Shinkansen 

This proposal initially involved introducing Gauge Change Trains (GCT) travelling from Hakata to Shin-Tosu on the existing Kyushu Shinkansen line, then passing through a specific gauge changing (standard to narrow) section of track linking to the existing Nagasaki Main Line, along which it would travel to Hizen Yamaguchi, then onto the Sasebo Line to Takeo-Onsen, where another gauge changing section (narrow to standard) would lead onto the final Shinkansen line to Nagasaki. However, significant technical issues with the axles of the GCT resulted in its cancellation. 

On 28 October 2020, JR Kyushu announced it would utilize a 6-car version of the N700S for the isolated Shinkansen section from Nagasaki, with 'cross platform' change to a relay service at Takeo Onsen station to connect to Hakata. JR Kyushu also announced the service would continue to use the name 'Kamome' for the Hakata-Nagasaki service, which has been in use since 1961.

The Shinkansen line shortens the distance between Hakata and Nagasaki by 6.2%, and while only 64% of the route is built to full Shinkansen standards, it eliminated the slowest sections of the previous narrow gauge route.

As part of the GCT proposal, the current  section of single track between Hizen Yamaguchi and Takeo Onsen was proposed to be duplicated. However, due to the issues with the development of the GCT, the proposal has not advanced.

The initial section between Nagasaki and Takeo Onsen opened on 23 September 2022.

Maglev (Chuo Shinkansen) 
As a result of this extensive testing, maglev technology is almost ready for public usage. This section will be incorporated into the Chūō Shinkansen which will eventually link Tokyo to Osaka. Construction of the Shinagawa to Nagoya section began in 2014, with 86% of the  route to be in tunnels.

However, as of 2022, continuing controversy over routing across the Ōi River has prevented the start of construction in Shizuoka, and there is currently no target date for opening.

Following the shortest route (through the Japanese Alps), JR Central estimates that it will take 40 minutes to run from Shinagawa to Nagoya. The planned travel time from Shinagawa to Shin-Osaka is 1 hour 7 minutes. Currently the Tokaido Shinkansen has a minimum connection time of 2 hours 19 minutes.

However, that would increase both the travel time (from Tokyo to Nagoya) and the cost of construction. JR Central has confirmed it will construct the line through Kanagawa Prefecture, and terminate at Shinagawa Station.

The route for the Nagoya to Osaka section is also contested. Kyoto is lobbying to have the route moved north and be largely aligned with the existing Tokaido Shinkansen, which services Kyoto and not Nara.

Mini-Shinkansen 
 is the name given to the routes where former narrow gauge lines have been converted to standard gauge to allow Shinkansen trains to travel to cities without the expense of constructing full Shinkansen standard lines.

Two mini-shinkansen routes have been constructed: the Yamagata Shinkansen and Akita Shinkansen. Shinkansen services to these lines traverse the Tohoku Shinkansen line from Tokyo before branching off to traditional main lines. On both the Yamagata/Shinjo and Akita lines, the narrow gauge lines were regauged, resulting in the local services being operated by standard gauge versions of  suburban/interurban rolling stock. On the Akita line between Omagari and Akita, one of the two narrow gauge lines was regauged, and a section of the remaining narrow gauge line is dual gauge, providing the opportunity for Shinkansen services to pass each other without stopping.

As the Loading gauge (size of the train that can travel on a line) was not altered when the rail gauge was widened, only Shinkansen trains specially built for these routes can travel on the lines. At present they are the E3 and E6 series trains.

Whilst no further Mini-shinkansen routes have been proposed to date, it remains an option for providing Shinkansen services to cities on the narrow gauge network.

Proposed Ou Base Tunnel
Construction of a Base tunnel on the Yamagata Shinkansen is proposed, with JR East having undertaken a survey of a planned route from Niwasaka to Sekine, just south of Yonezawa station.  of the proposed  line would be in tunnel, mostly to the north of the existing  Fukushima – Yamagata section. To be built on an improved alignment, the tunnel would lower journey times between Fukushima and Yamagata by ~10 min due to a proposed line speed of up to 200 km/h.

The tunnel would avoid the Itaya Toge pass through the Ou mountains west of Fukushima. Between 2011 and 2017 a total of 410 Yamagata mini-Shinkansen services were either suspended or delayed, and 40% of these incidents occurred on the line over the Itaya Toge pass.

If the  base tunnel is authorised, detailed design would take five years and construction another 15 years. The cost could increase by  if the tunnel were to be built with a cross-section large enough to permit the line to be upgraded to the full Shinkansen loading gauge.

Gauge Change Train 

This is the name for the concept of using a single train that is specially designed to travel on both  narrow gauge railway lines and the  standard gauge used by Shinkansen train services in Japan. The trucks/bogies of the Gauge Change Train (GCT) allow the wheels to be unlocked from the axles, narrowed or widened as necessary, and then relocked. This allows a GCT to traverse both standard gauge and narrow gauge tracks without the expense of regauging lines.

Three test trains have been constructed, with the second set having completed reliability trials on the Yosan Line east of Matsuyama (in Shikoku) in September 2013. The third set was undertaking gauge changing trials at Shin-Yatsushiro Station (on Kyushu), commencing in 2014 for a proposed three-year period, however testing was suspended in December 2014 after accumulating approximating , following the discovery of defective thrust bearing oil seals on the bogies. The train was being trialled between Kumamoto, travelling on the narrow gauge line to Shin-Yatsushiro, where a gauge changer has been installed, so the GCT could then be trialled on the Shinkansen line to Kagoshima.

GCTs were proposed to provide the Shinkansen service from the line's scheduled opening in fiscal 2022, however with the GCT now being cancelled, JR Kyushu has announced it will provide an interim 'relay' service.

Competition with air 
Compared with air transport, the Shinkansen has several advantages, including scheduling frequency and flexibility, punctual operation, comfortable seats, lower carbon emissions, and convenient city-centre terminals.

Shinkansen fares are generally competitive with domestic air fares.

During snowy weather, the Shinkansen is known to face fewer delays compared to air travel due to snow. One study done in 2016 concluded that the Tohoku Shinkansen between Tokyo and Aomori had substantially fewer days with delays longer than 30 minutes compared to air travel.

 Tokyo – Nagoya, Tokyo – Sendai, Tokyo – Hanamaki (Morioka), Tokyo – Niigata: There were air services between these cities, but they were withdrawn after Shinkansen services started. Shinkansen runs between these cities in about two hours or less.
 Tokyo – Osaka: Shinkansen is dominant because of fast (2 hours 22 minutes) and frequent service (up to every 10 minutes by Nozomi); however, air travel has a certain share (~20–30%).
 Tokyo – Okayama, Tokyo – Hiroshima: Shinkansen is reported to have increased its market share from ~40% to ~60% over the last decade. The Shinkansen takes about three to four hours and there are Nozomi trains every 30 minutes, but airlines may provide cheaper fares, attracting price-conscious passengers.
 Tokyo – Fukuoka: The Shinkansen takes about five hours on the fastest Nozomi, and discount carriers have made air travel far cheaper, so most people choose air. Additionally, unlike many cities, there is very little convenience advantage for the location of the Shinkansen stations of the two cities as Fukuoka Airport is located near the central Tenjin district, and Fukuoka City Subway Line 1 connects the Airport and Tenjin via Hakata Station and Haneda Airport is similarly conveniently located.
 Osaka – Fukuoka: One of the most competitive sections. The Shinkansen takes about two and a half hours by Nozomi or Mizuho, and the JR West Hikari Rail Star or JR West/JR Kyushu Sakura trains operate twice an hour, taking about 2 hours and 40 minutes between the two cities. Again the location of the airports involved helps with the popularity of air travel.
 Tokyo – Aomori: The fastest Shinkansen service between these cities is 3 hours. JAL is reported to have reduced the size of planes servicing this route since the Shinkansen extension opened in 2010.
 Tokyo – Hokuriku: The fastest Shinkansen service between these cities is 2 hours. ANA is reported to have reduced the number of services from Tokyo to Kanazawa and Toyama from 6 to 4 per day since the Shinkansen extension opened in 2015. The share of passengers travelling this route by air is reported to have dropped from 40% to 10% in the same period.

Shinkansen technology outside Japan 

Railways using Shinkansen technology are not limited to those in Japan.

Existing

Taiwan 
The first Shinkansen type exported outside Japan.

China 
The China Railway CRH2, built by CSR Sifang Loco & Rolling stocks corporation, with the license purchased from a consortium formed of Kawasaki Heavy Industries, Mitsubishi Electric Corporation, and Hitachi, is based on the E2-1000 series design.

United Kingdom 
Class 395 EMUs were built by Hitachi based on Shinkansen technology for use on high-speed commuter services in Britain on the High Speed 1 line.

Class 800 bi-mode trains were built by Hitachi for Great Western Railway and London North Eastern Railway.

Class 801 EMUs were built by Hitachi for London North Eastern Railway.

Under contract

United States 
In 2014, it was announced that Texas Central Railway would build a ~ long line using the N700 series rolling stock.

India 

In December 2015, India and Japan signed an agreement for the construction of India's first high speed rail link connecting Mumbai to Ahmedabad. Funded primarily through Japanese soft loans, the link is expected to cost up to US$18.6 billion and should be operational in about 6 years.

This followed India and Japan conducting feasibility studies on high-speed rail and dedicated freight corridors.

During Indian Prime Minister Manmohan Singh's visit to Tokyo in December 2006, Japan assured cooperation with India in creating a high-speed link between New Delhi and Mumbai. In January 2009, the then Railway Minister Lalu Prasad rode a bullet train travelling from Tokyo to Kyoto.

In December 2013 a Japanese consortium was appointed to undertake a feasibility study of a ~ high-speed line between Mumbai and Ahmedabad by July 2015. A total of 7 high-speed lines are in planning stages in India, and Japanese firms have now succeeded in winning contracts to prepare feasibility studies for three of the lines.

The National High Speed Rail Corporation (NHSRC) was incorporated in 2017 to manage all HSR related activities in India. Under its management, a High Speed Rail Training Institute is being developed with Japanese assistance in Vadodara, Gujarat. After the laying of the foundation stone for the Mumbai and Ahmedabad by the Prime Ministers of India and Japan in September 2017, work began on preparatory surveys along the  route. Most of the civil works for the elevated viaduct shall be handled by Indian companies, while the deep-sea tunnel at Mumbai will be handled by a Japanese consortium (along with other technical aspects, such as safety, electricals, communication systems, signaling, and rolling stock). BHEL of India and Kawasaki Heavy Industries of Japan have entered into a technology collaboration agreement to build and assemble the rolling stock (of E5 series) in India. Other potential joint ventures are being explored under the patronage of NHSRC. The line is expected to be operational by 2026.

Proposed subject to funding

Thailand

Japan will provide Shinkansen technology for a high-speed rail link between Bangkok and the northern city of Chiang Mai under an agreement reached with Thailand on 27 May 2015. Total project costs are estimated in excess of 1 trillion yen ($8.1 billion). Several hurdles remain, however, including securing the funding. If the project is realized, it would mark the fifth time Shinkansen technology has been exported.

Potential opportunities

Australia 
A private organisation dedicated to aiding the Australian Government in delivering high speed rail, Consolidated Land and Rail Australia, has considered purchasing Shinkansen technology or SC Maglev rolling stock for a potential Melbourne-Canberra-Sydney-Brisbane line. A business case has been prepared for the government by Infrastructure Australia, and was awaiting confirmation of the project within the 2018 federal budget.

Ireland 
As part of the Ireland 2040 infrastructural upgrade scheme, a high-speed rail network using Shinkansen technology is being investigated along the Cork-Dublin-Belfast axis, spanning the island of Ireland from north to south.

United States and Canada 

The U.S. Federal Railroad Administration was in talks with a number of countries concerning high-speed rail, notably Japan, France and Spain. On 16 May 2009, FRA Deputy Chief Karen Rae expressed hope that Japan would offer its technical expertise to Canada and the United States. Transportation Secretary Ray LaHood indicated interest in test riding the Japanese Shinkansen in 2009.

On 1 June 2009, JR Central Chairman, Yoshiyuki Kasai, announced plans to export both the N700 Series Shinkansen high-speed train system and the SCMaglev to international export markets, including the United States and Canada.

Brazil 
Japan had promoted its Shinkansen technology to the Government of Brazil for use on the once planned high-speed rail set to link Rio de Janeiro, São Paulo and Campinas. On 14 November 2008, Japanese Deputy Prime Minister Tarō Asō and Brazilian President Luiz Inácio Lula da Silva talked about this rail project. President Lula asked a consortium of Japanese companies to participate in the bidding process. Prime Minister Aso concurred on the bilateral cooperation to improve rail infrastructure in Brazil, including the Rio–São Paulo–Campinas high-speed rail line. The Japanese consortium included the Ministry of Land, Infrastructure, Transport and Tourism, Mitsui & Co., Mitsubishi Heavy Industries, Kawasaki Heavy Industries and Toshiba. Nothing was implemented.

Vietnam 
Vietnam Railways was considering the use of Shinkansen technology for high-speed rail between the capital Hanoi and the southern commercial hub of Ho Chi Minh City, according to the Nihon Keizai Shimbun, citing an interview with Chief Executive Officer Nguyen Huu Bang. The Vietnamese government had already given basic approval for the Shinkansen system, although it still requires financing and formal consent from the prime minister. Vietnam rejected a funding proposal in 2010, so funding for the $56 billion project is uncertain. Hanoi was exploring additional Japanese funding Official Development Assistance as well as funds from the World Bank and Asian Development Bank. The  line would replace the current colonial-era rail line. Vietnam hoped to launch high-speed trains by 2020 and planned to start by building three sections, including a  stretch between the central coastal cities of Da Nang and Huế, seen as potentially most profitable. Vietnam Railways had sent engineers to Central Japan Railway Company for technical training.

See also 

 Transport in Japan
 Rail transport in Japan
 Shanghai Maglev Train
 High speed rail in China
 High speed rail in Europe
 High speed rail in India
 High speed rail in the United States

References

Further reading

External links 

 Shinkansen Data , explanation by International High-speed Rail Association (IHRA) 

 Biting the Bullet: What we can learn from the Shinkansen, discussion paper by Christopher Hood in the electronic journal of contemporary Japanese studies, 23 May 2001
 East meets West, a story of how the Shinkansen brought Tokyo and Osaka closer together.
 Bullet on wheels, a travel report by Vinod Jacob 19 August 2005
 Shinkansen Wheelchair Accessibility, review for riders with disabilities.

High-speed rail in Japan
High-speed trains
Rail transport brands
Railway services introduced in 1964
1964 establishments in Japan